Communist Party of Nepal (Marxist) is a political party in Nepal. The party is registered with the Election Commission of Nepal ahead of the 2008 Constituent Assembly election.

Ahead of the 2008 Constituent Assembly election, the party presented a closed proportional representation list with 38 candidates, headed by Durga Prasad Gyawali. The party presented 4 candidates for the First Past the Post seats.

See also
 List of communist parties in Nepal

References

Communist parties in Nepal
Political parties established in 2006
2006 establishments in Nepal